The Shire of Wycheproof was a local government area about  northwest of Bendigo in northwestern Victoria, Australia.

History

Wycheproof was originally part of the St Arnaud Road District, which was incorporated in 1861, and became a Shire in 1864. On 27 April 1894, the North Riding of the Shire was severed and proclaimed as the Shire of Wycheproof, after a successful petition from the residents of Wycheproof to the Commissioner of Public Works. Over the years, several boundary changes occurred:

 31 May 1897 - Parts of the Shire of Castle Donnington was annexed as the Tyrrell Riding.
 28 April 1898 - Parts of the Shire of Donald was annexed to the South Riding.
 31 May 1906 - Wycheproof lost parts of its Tyrrell Riding to the Shire of Karkarooc.
 21 December 1936 - Parts of the Shire of Swan Hill annexed as part of the Tyrrell Riding
 10 May 1949 - Wycheproof lost parts of its Central Riding to the Shire of Birchip.

On 20 January 1995, the Shire of Wycheproof was abolished, and along with the Shires of Birchip, Charlton, Donald and parts of the Shire of Kara Kara, was merged into the newly created Shire of Buloke.

Wards

Wycheproof was divided into four ridings, each of which elected three councillors, except for Bunguluke which elected two councillors.

 Bunguluke Riding
 Myall Riding
 Thalia Riding
 Tyrrell Riding

Towns and localities

* Council seat.

Population

* Estimate in the 1958 Victorian Year Book.

References

External links
 Victorian Places - Wycheproof Shire

Wycheproof
1894 establishments in Australia